Klaus-Peter Schulze (born 3 July 1954) is a German politician. Born in Döbern, Brandenburg, he represents the CDU. Klaus-Peter Schulze has served as a member of the Bundestag from the state of Brandenburg from 2013 to October 2021.

Life 
He became member of the bundestag after the 2013 German federal election. He is a member of the Committee on Tourism and the Committee on Environment, Nature Conservation and Nuclear Safety. In January 2021, Schulze announced, that he will not be start in 2021 German federal election.

References

External links 

  
 Bundestag biography 

1954 births
Living people
Members of the Bundestag for Brandenburg
Members of the Bundestag 2017–2021
Members of the Bundestag 2013–2017
Members of the Bundestag for the Christian Democratic Union of Germany